Yelena Ivanovna Yefimova (born 1948 in Russia) is a Russian artist and sculptor and a member of the National Association of Art crafts and Guild masters (armourers division). She has participated in six specialized weapons exhibitions and more than twenty other national and international exhibitions. Her works are in private and museum collections, including the collection of the State Historical and Cultural Museum-Reserve at the Moscow Kremlin.

She graduated in 1968 from Abramtsevo Artistic-Industrial College, Vasnetsova, in the department of art of carving on bone. From 1968 to 1974, she worked at the "Northern Souvenirs" Chukchi at workshop in the village Uelen. From 1976 to 1987 she was chief artist at the Research Institute of the Art Industry in the scientific laboratory of bones, skin, and fur. She has 35 years of experience in the fields of jewelry and decorative arts. She is a member of the National Club of the Hortaya borzaya breed of borzoi dogs.

Exhibitions and awards
 1985: All-Union Exhibition: Exhibition Complex "Youth Councils of the Country"
 1986 – 1990: Zone exhibition "Artists of Moscow"
 1987 – 1995: the fall-spring records of applied Moscow
 1987: Exhibition: "The 70th Anniversary of Soviet Power" in Moscow Manege
 1987: "Animal Russia"
 1987: International Exhibition: Exhibition of decorative arts in Bulgaria. "Jewelry kit" (artists-jewelers)
 1988: Exhibition of decorative arts in St. Petersburg
 1988: "Artists—People" in the State Historical Museum in Moscow
 1989: Exhibition—Competition of the Moscow area applied in the Podolsk (under the slogan "North"), I and II awards.
 1990: "Contemporary Art Jewelry" (All-Union Museum of Decorative Art)
 1994: All-Union Museum of Decorative and Applied Arts. Diploma for the best jewelry set of dice
 1996: Leading master carver of ivory in the All-Union Museum of Decorative Art
 1998: Moscow National Museum (August–September), competition "Gold and weapon skill in turn of the century Russia" – "Our Names", second place
 1999: "Contemporary art weapons in Russia" and an exhibition of works at the Guild Ceremonial Hall of the Russian Culture Foundation
 2000: Russia Blades. In the Armory Chamber of the State Historical and Cultural Museum, Reserve Moscow Kremlin
 2001: "Blades Russia" in the Armory Chamber of the State Historical and Cultural Museum, Reserve Moscow Kremlin
 2002: Weapons of Cultural Value" at the State Duma of the Russian Federation
 2002:  International exhibition titled "Nature, Hunting and Hunting Trophies"
 2003: "Modern edged Art Weapons" in the Tula, Russia Tula State Museum of Weapons
 2004: "Contemporary Art Weapons" at the Russian commemorative conference in Moscow on the 35th anniversary of the creation of the U.S.–Russia Joint Commission on POW/MIAs
 2004: Biennale "Blades Russia" at the Exhibition Hall in the Kremlin Assumption Belfry
 2006: "Contemporary Art Edged Weapons" in Tula State Museum of Weapons
 2007: First International Festival of Contemporary Art "Traditions and Modernity" in Manezh (Moscow)

Gallery
 1998: Dagger and bobby pin "Snow Amazon"
 1999: Knife on a stand "Raccoon"
 1999: Knife on a stand "Jaguar"
 2000: Knife "Encounter"
 2001: Knife "Life is Short. Art is Forever"
 2002: Sculpture song "Tenderness"
 2003: Knife desk "Walrus"
 2003: Desktop composition "Life For Life"
 2004: Desktop composition "My"
 2006: Cabinet knife "Raccoon"
 2006: Desktop composition "Tiger" and "Boar" of the author's series "Encounter"
 2006: Desktop composition "Bear" and walruses" of the author's series "Encounter"
 2006: Desktop composition "Russian Rugby"
 2008: Desktop song "Sovyata"
 2008: Desktop composition "The Bear and Lahtak"

Galleries and museums
 The artist's works were acquired by leading museums: State Historical Museum, Historical and Architectural Museum of Art New Jerusalem, and the Sergiev Posad State Historical-Artistic Museum
Art Fund Union of Artists

References

External links

 National Club of Breed Borzoi Horta
 Guild Masters – Armourers
 Masters armourers from Moscow
 Official Site AHPK them. Vasnetsov
 Old photos
 The Center for Contemporary Art
 Chukotka ivory carving
 Uelen – Uelenskaya bone shop
 Products from mammoth tusk
 Ragtime – (Russian souvenir)

American women sculptors
1948 births
American contemporary artists
Sculptors from New York (state)
Living people
American abstract artists
21st-century American women artists